A statue of Robert Burns by Melvin Earl Cummings is installed in San Francisco's Golden Gate Park, in the U.S. state of California.

External links
 

Golden Gate Park
Monuments and memorials in California
Outdoor sculptures in San Francisco
Cultural depictions of Robert Burns
Sculptures of men in California
Statues in California
Statues of writers